Paul Malcolm Blakeley (born 27 May 1964) is a former English cricketer.  Blakeley was a right-handed batsman who bowled right-arm medium pace.  He was born in Dewsbury, Yorkshire.

Blakeley made his debut for Shropshire in the 1993 Minor Counties Championship against Berkshire.  Blakeley played Minor counties cricket for Shropshire from 1993 to 1994, which included 14 Minor Counties Championship appearances and 2 MCCA Knockout Trophy matches.  He made his only List A appearance against Somerset in the 1993 NatWest Trophy.  In this match, he bowled 8 wicket-less overs for the cost of 69 runs, while with the bat he scored 23 runs before being dismissed by Mushtaq Ahmed.

References

External links
Paul Blakeley at ESPNcricinfo

1964 births
Living people
Cricketers from Dewsbury
English cricketers of 1969 to 2000
English cricketers
Shropshire cricketers